Winfried Bausback (born 22 October 1965) is a German politician, representative of the Christian Social Union of Bavaria.

Political career
Bausback is a member of the Landtag of Bavaria. Since 2008 he has represented Stimmkreis Aschaffenburg-West in the Landtag.

Following the 2013 state elections, Bausback was named State Minister of Justice in the government of Minister-President Horst Seehofer.

In the negotiations to form a Grand Coalition of the Christian Democrats and the Social Democrats (SPD) following the 2013 federal elections, Bausback was part of the CDU/CSU delegation in the working group on internal and legal affairs, led by Hans-Peter Friedrich and Thomas Oppermann.

Other activities
 University of Würzburg, Member of the Board of Trustees

See also
List of Bavarian Christian Social Union politicians

References

Ministers of the Bavaria State Government
Christian Social Union in Bavaria politicians
1965 births
Living people